Healy Heights is a Portland, Oregon neighborhood in the West Hills of the city's Southwest section.  Though recognized by the city as a neighborhood in its own right, it lies entirely within the boundaries of the city's Southwest Hills neighborhood.

The neighborhood association holds its annual potluck dinner in Healy Heights Park (1951) on the second Sunday in September.

References

External links
 Guide to Healy Heights Neighborhood (PortlandNeighborhood.com)

Neighborhoods in Portland, Oregon
Southwest Portland, Oregon